Vanja Džaferović  (born 19 March 1983) is a Croatian actor, TV personality and former footballer.

Early life 
Džaferović was born in Bosanski Brod, Bosnia and Herzegovina, and moved with his family in his childhood to Croatia due to the Bosnian War.

Career

Football career
Džaferović began his career in the local NK Inter Zaprešić. In June 2002, he transferred to HNK Segesta from Croatian town Sisak.

In July 2005 he signed for Beroe Stara Zagora in the Bulgarian A PFG, for an undisclosed fee. On 7 August 2005, he made his league debut in a 3–1 away loss against Vihren Sandanski. Džaferović scored his first ever goal for Beroe on 18 March 2006 against Litex Lovech; Beroe won 3–1. On 26 October 2006, Beroe manager Ilian Iliev chose Vanja as his club captain.

In 2008 Džaferović signed with Lokomotiv Sofia. He remained at Lokomotiv until July 2010 when he joined Ethnikos Achna after his contract expired, but he never played for the Cyprus team. The following month, he suffered a severe injury and was ruled out for nine months.

Džaferović was out of contract with Ethnikos when he was signed by the Beroe manager Ilian Iliev on 15 December 2010. Džaferović's first appearance back at Beroe was as a substitute against Akademik Sofia on 8 May 2011. Unfortunately, he sustained another injury during his time with Beroe and eventually did not return to football. Džaferović has made 129 appearances in the A PFG, being in the "top 20 club" for foreign players in the top flight of Bulgarian football.

TV career
In 2014 Džaferović won the 5th season of the Bulgarian version of the popular reality show Survivor. In 2015 he finished as runner-up in the all-star spin-off of Big Brother – Big Brother All Stars. He also joined Your Face Sounds Familiar in 2017 as a contender.

In 2020 he got TV series debut in a main role, joining the Bulgarian TV Series Strawberry Moon, where he plays the role of Alex, a firefighter.

Personal life
Džaferović is married to Evgeniya, a TV personality and participant of Survivor BG: Pearl Islands. In 2012 he completed some paperwork to allow him to stay in Bulgaria.

Career statistics

Filmography

References

External links
 
 

1983 births
Living people
People from Brod, Bosnia and Herzegovina
Croats of Bosnia and Herzegovina
Association football central defenders
Croatian footballers
Bosnia and Herzegovina footballers
HNK Segesta players
PFC Beroe Stara Zagora players
FC Lokomotiv 1929 Sofia players
Ethnikos Achna FC players
Second Football League (Croatia) players
First Football League (Croatia) players
First Professional Football League (Bulgaria) players
Bosnia and Herzegovina expatriate footballers
Expatriate footballers in Croatia
Bosnia and Herzegovina expatriate sportspeople in Croatia
Expatriate footballers in Bulgaria
Bosnia and Herzegovina expatriate sportspeople in Bulgaria
Expatriate footballers in Cyprus
Bosnia and Herzegovina expatriate sportspeople in Cyprus
Big Brother (Bulgarian TV series) contestants